Hanna Haarala (born in Finland) is a professional Latin American dancer. She has represented Finland with Mikko Kaasalainen at the European and World Games. Her current professional partner is Andrew Cuerden. She competed in series 3 of the BBC's successful dance show Strictly Come Dancing in 2005, reaching seventh place with actor Will Thorp.

References

External links

Finnish female dancers
Finnish ballroom dancers
Living people
Year of birth missing (living people)
Competitors at the 2001 World Games